John Hugh Crimmins (November 26, 1919 – December 12, 2007) was a diplomat and former United States Ambassador to Dominican Republic (1966–69) and Brazil (1973–78). He was a member of the American Academy of Diplomacy.

He graduated from Harvard University in 1941. During World War II he served with the army in the Pacific theatre of operations.

References

External links

1919 births
2007 deaths
United States Army personnel of World War II
Ambassadors of the United States to Brazil
Ambassadors of the United States to the Dominican Republic
People from Worcester, Massachusetts
Harvard University alumni